Greg “Bird Dog” Smyth (April 23, 1966 – February 16, 2018) was a Canadian professional ice hockey defenceman who played ten seasons in the National Hockey League (NHL).

Playing career
Smyth was born in Oakville, Ontario. As a youth, he played in the 1979 Quebec International Pee-Wee Hockey Tournament with a minor ice hockey team from Mississauga. 

He later played in the NHL for the Philadelphia Flyers, Quebec Nordiques, Calgary Flames, Florida Panthers, Toronto Maple Leafs, and Chicago Blackhawks. He was known as an enforcer during his playing career.

Playing the final three seasons of his career within the Maple Leafs organization, primarily with the St. John's Maple Leafs of the AHL, Smyth embarked on a coaching career in the 1999–2000 season with St. John's as an assistant coach. Less than a month into the season, Smyth got into a physical altercation with St. John’s forwards David Nemirovsky and Jason Bonsignore Portland, Maine after a game against the Portland Pirates, in which Smyth was let go the next day.

Smyth briefly returned to playing, playing 9 games with the London Knights of the British Superleague, before ending his professional career.

Coached the Junior Celtics in the St. John's Junior Hockey League, winning the prestigious  Veitch Trophy in 2001.

Death
Smyth died of cancer on February 16, 2018, he was 51 years old.

Career statistics

References

External links
 

1966 births
2018 deaths
Calgary Flames players
Canadian ice hockey defencemen
Chicago Blackhawks players
Chicago Wolves (IHL) players
Florida Panthers players
Halifax Citadels players
Hershey Bears players
Ice hockey people from Ontario
Indianapolis Ice players
London Knights players
London Knights (UK) players
People from Oakville, Ontario
Philadelphia Flyers draft picks
Philadelphia Flyers players
Quebec Nordiques players
St. John's Maple Leafs players
Salt Lake Golden Eagles (IHL) players
Toronto Maple Leafs players
Canadian expatriate ice hockey players in the United States